The University of Defence is a public university in Serbia. It was founded by the decree of the Government of Serbia in 2011, consisted of two faculties with the headquarters in Belgrade.

Organisation
The University consists of two schools:
 Military Academy
 Medical School of Military Medical Academy

See also
 Education in Serbia
 List of universities in Serbia

References

External links

 

 
Educational institutions established in 2011
2011 establishments in Serbia
Education in Belgrade
Universities in Belgrade